Diaspidini is a tribe of armored scale insects.

Genera

Achionaspis
Adiscofiorinia
Afiorinia
Africaspis
Albastaspis
Aloaspis
Amphisoma
Anaimalaia
Artemisaspis
Asymetraspis
Augulaspis
Aulacaspis
Balachowskiella
Balaspis
Bantudiaspis
Bayokaspis
Cameronaspis
Carulaspis
Chionandaspis
Chionaspis
Chlidaspis
Contigaspis
Cooleyaspis
Coronaspis
Costalimaspis
Credodiaspis
Crockeraspis
Cryptaspidus
Crypthemichionaspis
Cryptodiaspis
Cupidaspis
Damaia
Dentachionaspis
Dentaspis
Diaspidistis
Diaspis
Diaulacaspis
Dungunia
Duplachionaspis
Duplaspis
Epidiaspis
Epifiorinia
Eucleaspis
Eudinaspis
Exuviaspis
Fijifiorinia
Fiorinia
Fissuraspis
Fraseraspis
Gadaspis
Geodiaspis
Getulaspis
Greenaspis
Guineaspis
Guizhoaspis
Haliaspis
Heimaspis
Hemaspidis
Hovaspis
Hybridaspis
Ichthyaspis
Imerinaspis
Inchoaspis
Incisaspis
Kuchinaspis
Kulatinganaspis
Kuwanaspis
Kyphosoma
Laingaspis
Larutaspis
Ledaspis
Lineaspis
Madagaspis
Magnospinus
Mammata
Mancaspis
Marchalaspis
Mayonia
Medangaspis
Megacanthaspis
Miscanthaspis
Moraspis
Myrtaspis
Namibia
Narayanaspis
Natalaspis
Nelaspis
Neochionaspis
Neoparlaspis
Neoquernaspis
Neosignoretia
Nicholiella
Nikkoaspis
Parachionaspis
Parafiorinia
Paragadaspis
Pelliculaspis
Pentacicola
Phenacaspis
Pinangaspis
Pinnaspis
Poliaspis
Primaspis
Proceraspis
Protodiaspis
Pseudaulacaspis
Quernaspis
Rolaspis
Roureaspis
Rutherfordia
Salaspis
Sclopetaspis
Semonggokia
Serrachionaspis
Serrataspis
Shansiaspis
Singapuraspis
Sinistraspis
Sinoquernaspis
Takahashiaspis
Tamuraspis
Tecaspis
Tenuiaspis
Thoa
Thysanofiorinia
Trichomytilus
Trigonaspis
Trullifiorinia
Tsimbazaspis
Tulefiorinia
Umbaspis
Unachionaspis
Unaspis
Variaspis
Versiculaspis
Vinculaspis
Voraspis
Xerophilaspis
Xiphuraspis
Yomaspis
Yuanaspis
Yunnanaspis

References

 
Hemiptera tribes
Diaspidinae